The Paper Chase is a 1973 American comedy-drama film starring Timothy Bottoms, Lindsay Wagner, and John Houseman, and directed by James Bridges.

Based on John Jay Osborn Jr.'s 1971 novel The Paper Chase, it tells the story of James Hart, a first-year law student at Harvard Law School, his experiences with Professor Charles Kingsfield, a brilliant and demanding contract law instructor, and Hart's relationship with Kingsfield's daughter. Houseman earned an Academy Award for Best Supporting Actor for his performance as the professor. Houseman later reprised the role in a TV series of the same name that lasted four seasons, following Hart, played by James Stephens, through his three years of law school.

Plot
James T. Hart starts his first year at Harvard Law School in a contract law course with Professor Charles W. Kingsfield Jr. When Kingsfield immediately delves into the material using the Socratic method and asks Hart the first question, Hart is totally unprepared and feels so humiliated that, after class, he throws up in the bathroom.

Hart is invited to join a study group with five others:
 Franklin Ford, the fifth generation of Fords at Harvard Law School
 Kevin Brooks, a married man with a photographic memory but lacking in analytical skills
 Thomas Anderson
 Willis Bell, who is devoted to property law
 O'Connor
Each member of the group agrees to focus on a specific course and write a synopsis of their notes to share with each other before the final exams. Hart chooses contract law.

While out getting pizza, Hart is asked by a woman, Susan Fields, to walk her home, as she says she feels uncomfortable about a man who has been following her. Hart returns to her house soon after and asks her on a date, after which they begin a complicated relationship: she resents the time he devotes to his studies and his fascination with Kingsfield, while he expects her to provide him with considerable attention and wants a firm commitment. When Hart and a select few of his classmates are invited to a cocktail party hosted by Kingsfield, he is stunned to discover that Susan is Kingsfield's married daughter. She is, however, separated from her husband and eventually gets a divorce. She and Hart break up and get back together several times.

Hart categorizes his classmates into three groups: those who have given up; those who are trying, but fear being called upon in class to respond to Kingsfield's questions; and the "upper echelon" who actively volunteer to answer. Hart strives to move from the second classification to the third, and succeeds as time goes on. 

Hart eventually learns of the existence of the "Red Set", the archived and sealed personal notes that Harvard professors wrote when they were students, which are stored in a locked room of the library. Late one night, Hart and Ford break into the library to read Kingsfield's notes.

The mounting pressure gets to everyone as the course nears its end. Brooks attempts suicide and drops out of school. The study group is torn apart by personal bickering, with only three of the six members remaining. With final exams looming, Hart and Ford hole up in a hotel room for three days and study feverishly. On the last day of class, Hart and his classmates give Kingsfield a standing ovation. Later, as Susan brings Hart his mail at the beach. Hart climbs to the highest rock, makes a paper airplane out of the unopened envelope containing his grades and sends it flying into the water.

The film is a faithful adaptation of the novel, although it adds two elements not in the book: Hart's first name and middle initial (James T.), and his final grade in contract law (93, an A).

Cast
 Timothy Bottoms as James T. Hart
 Lindsay Wagner as Susan Fields
 John Houseman as Charles W. Kingsfield Jr.
 Graham Beckel as Franklin Ford III
 James Naughton as Kevin Brooks
 Edward Herrmann as Thomas Craig Anderson
 Craig Richard Nelson as Willis 'Liberty' Bell
 Bob Lydiard as O'Connor
 Lenny Baker as William Moss, Tutor
 David Clennon as Toombs
 Regina Baff as Asheley Brooks
 Blair Brown as Miss Farranti

Inspiration for Kingsfield
There are several possible inspirations for the character. Retired Harvard Law professor Clark Byse is said to have been the inspiration for the character's position at Harvard Law School, though not the character's personality. According to John Houseman, the inspiration for Kingsfield was crusty professor Edward "Bull" Warren, also reflected in The Boston Globe in 2004. Houseman had noted that Kingsfield's behavior is actually a toned-down version of Warren's famous classroom rudeness, as enshrined in classroom lore, and recounted several examples of the professor's putdowns.

James Bridges originally earmarked James Mason for the Kingsfield role, but he was unavailable. After attempts to cast Melvyn Douglas, Edward G. Robinson, John Gielgud, Paul Scofield, and other famous actors in the role, Bridges offered it to Houseman, who agreed to fly to Toronto (where the film's interior sequences were to be shot) for a screen test. Bridges called it "fabulous", and Houseman accepted the part, thus launching his acting career. He had seldom acted before, but knew Bridges from the time he was a stage manager in Houseman's UCLA Professional Theater Group. Houseman then recommended Bridges as a writer for the television series Alfred Hitchcock Presents, for which Bridges wrote 18 teleplays before establishing himself as a motion picture writer-director.

Production
The exterior shots of the Harvard Law School buildings were filmed on the Harvard Law School campus, and the library shots were filmed in the Harvard Andover library at the Harvard Divinity School. All interiors were shot on stages in Toronto. In a 1999 interview, Gordon Willis said production designer George Jenkins "reproduced the Harvard Law School in The Paper Chase beautifully." The hotel scene was filmed at the Windsor Arms Hotel. The scene of Hart and Ford entering a building to take their final exam near the film's end was shot in front of the Law School's oldest building, iconic Austin Hall. Most of the extras for the Harvard Law School venue scenes were then current Harvard Law students, paid a $25 per diem by 20th Century Fox.

Willis shot The Paper Chase in anamorphic format due to the "schoolroom and the graphics in the film." He also commented on the cinematography, noting that the composition of the scenes with Houseman and Bottoms "related to who had command of the situation. We used huge close-ups of John, and demeaning shots of Timothy. Then as the movie goes along and Timothy begins to get on top of it, you'll notice the shot sizes begin to diminish on John and begin to get a little bit bigger on Timothy—until finally they are equal partners shooting back and forth."

Reception
Vincent Canby wrote that the film "goes slowly soft like a waxwork on a hot day, losing the shape and substance that at the beginning have rightfully engaged our attention;" he concludes "it takes a long while for The Paper Chase to disintegrate, and there are some funny, intelligent sequences along the way, but by the end it has melted into a blob of clichés." Jay Cocks called it a movie of "some incidental pleasures and insights and a great deal of silliness:"

What [writer/director] Bridges catches best is the peculiar tension of the classroom, the cool terror that can be instilled by an academic skilled in psychological warfare. His Ivy League Olympian is Kingsfield, a professor of contract law who passes along scholarship with finely tempered disdain. In an original bit of casting, Kingsfield is played by veteran theater and film producer John Houseman. It is a forbidding, superb performance, catching not only the coldness of such a man but the patrician crustiness that conceals deep and raging contempt.

The University of Chicago Law School called Houseman's rendition of the Socratic method "over-the-top", telling prospective students:

John Houseman may have won an Oscar for his impressive performance, but if anyone ever did teach a law school class like his Professor Kingsfield, no one at Chicago does today. Instead, our students discover quickly that the Socratic Method is a tool and a good one that is used to engage a large group of students in a discussion, while using probing questions to get at the heart of the subject matter. The Socratic Method is not used at Chicago to intimidate, nor to "break down" new law students, but instead for the very reason Socrates developed it: to develop critical thinking skills in students and enable them to approach the law as intellectuals.

Others disagreed; another reviewer found it accurate:

This is really the only serious flick about law school life. It's brooding and intense, perfectly capturing the dynamic between law professor and student. The movie is worth watching just for actor John Houseman's Academy Award-winning performance as Professor Kingsfield. Every school still has a professor that knows how to absolutely terrify the 1Ls — for us at UChicago, that was Richard "The Hammer" Helmholz.  The Paper Chases Professor Kingsfield is like a distillation every one of these scary arch-villain type professors.

Roger Ebert gave the movie four stars and singled out the performances of Bottoms and Houseman for praise.

On review aggregator Rotten Tomatoes, the film has an approval rating of 83% based on 30 reviews, with an average rating of 7.2/10.  On Metacritic, which sampled seven critic reviews and calculated a weighted average score of 67 out of 100, the film received "generally favorable reviews".

Awards and nominations

The American Film Institute has placed the film at #91 on its 100 Years...100 Cheers list.

Television series

The film was followed by a television series that ran for one season on CBS (1978–79) and three seasons on Showtime (1983–1986).

See also
 List of American films of 1973

References

External links

 
 
 
 
 

1973 films
1973 drama films
1970s English-language films
Films about lawyers
Films scored by John Williams
Films directed by James Bridges
Films adapted into television shows
Films based on American novels
Films set in the 1970s
Films set in Harvard University
Films about academia
Films about educators
Films about teacher–student relationships
Films set in Massachusetts
Films set in universities and colleges
Films shot in Toronto
Films shot in Massachusetts
Films featuring a Best Supporting Actor Academy Award-winning performance
Films featuring a Best Supporting Actor Golden Globe winning performance
Harvard Law School
History of Cambridge, Massachusetts
20th Century Fox films
American comedy-drama films
1970s American films